is located in Morioka, Iwate, Japan. The new racecourse was built in 1996 for horse racing.

Notable races 

Horse racing venues in Japan
Sports venues in Iwate Prefecture
Sport in Morioka
Sports venues completed in 1932
1932 establishments in Japan